Efrén Santos Moreno (born 9 January 1992) is a Mexican cyclist, who currently rides for UCI Continental team .

Major results

2014
 3rd Time trial, National Under-23 Road Championships
2016
 1st Stage 2 Vuelta Ciclista a Costa Rica
2017
 1st  Road race, National Road Championships
 3rd Overall Vuelta Ciclista a Costa Rica
1st Stages 1 & 9 
 3rd Overall Vuelta Ciclista de Chile
2018
 1st Stage 2 Vuelta Ciclista a Costa Rica
 10th Gran Premio Comité Olímpico Nacional
2019
 1st Stage 1 Grand Prix Cycliste de Saguenay
 2nd Overall Vuelta Ciclista a Costa Rica
 1st Stage 4 
 5th Overall Vuelta Ciclista de Chile
 7th Road race, Pan American Championships
 10th Overall Joe Martin Stage Race
2020
 1st Stage 6 Vuelta al Ecuador

References

External links
 

1992 births
Living people
Mexican male cyclists